Pancratius may refer to:

 Saint Pancras of Rome
 Pancratius, a priest who attended the 355 Council of Milan